The National Council of (the) Arts, Sciences and Professions (NCASP or  ASP) was a United States-based socialist organization of the 1950s.

The ASP sponsored the Cultural and Scientific Conference for World Peace, held at the Waldorf-Astoria hotel in New York City for 3 days in late March, 1949.    It was a controversial conference, picketed by Catholic War Veterans.  W. E. B. Du Bois gave an impassioned speech on the final night.   The ASP asked Du Bois to represent them at the World Congress of the Partisans of Peace in Paris in April 1949.   Du Bois also attended, on behalf of the ASP, the All-Soviet Peace Conference in August 1949.

See also

 Independent Citizens Committee of the Arts, Sciences and Professions
 Progressive Citizens of America

References

External links
 FBI report

1940s establishments in the United States
Anti–nuclear weapons movement
Peace organizations based in the United States